Ranajit Kumar Roy (রণজিত কুমার রায়) is a Bangladesh Awami League politician and the incumbent Member of Parliament from Jessore-4.

Early life
Roy was born on 1 February 1955. He has studied up to H.S.C or grade 12.

Career
Roy was elected to Parliament in 2008 from Jessore-4 as an Awami League candidate.

Roy was re-elected to Parliament in 2014 from Jessore-4 as an Awami League candidate.

Roy was re-elected to Parliament in 2019 from Jessore-4 as an Awami League candidate with 273,234 votes while his nearest rival, TS Ayub of Bangladesh Nationalist Party, received 30,874. His nomination was opposed by Awami League activists from Jessore who described him as corrupt at a press conference at the Dhaka Reporters' Unity; allegations he has refuted.

References

Awami League politicians
Living people
1955 births
10th Jatiya Sangsad members
11th Jatiya Sangsad members
9th Jatiya Sangsad members